The 37th Great North Run took place on 10 September 2017 in Newcastle-upon-Tyne, England, United Kingdom with the men's and women's elite races and wheelchair races. Olympic and World champion Mo Farah, in his first race since ending his career on the track, won the Great North Run for the fourth year in a row. He became the first man to win the run four years in a row. Mary Keitany won the women's race for the third time in four years.

Briton Simon Lawson won the men's wheelchair race for the first time. Swiss Manuela Schär also won the women's wheelchair race for the first time. Schär also broke the course record held by Amanda McGrory, by finishing in a time of 48 minutes, 44 seconds.

After Jake Robertson finished 2nd in the men's elite race, he proposed to his girlfriend, fellow runner Magdalyne Masai.

Results

Elite races

Elite Men

Elite Women

Wheelchair races
Wheelchair Men

Wheelchair Women

References

Half marathons in the United Kingdom
2017 in British sport
2017 in athletics (track and field)